Wigram may refer to:

 Wigram, a suburb of Christchurch, New Zealand
 Wigram (New Zealand electorate), its electorate
 Wigram Aerodrome, former Royal New Zealand Air Force base
 Wigram Airfield Circuit, motor racing circuit there
 Lady Wigram Trophy, trophy formerly awarded there
 Wigram Museum, properly known as the Royal New Zealand Air Force Museum
 Wigram Beer, brewery there

Wigram may also refer to:

 Wigram (surname)
 Baron Wigram, a title in the Peerage of the United Kingdom
 Wigram baronets, a title in the Baronetage of the United Kingdom